Brother Rice High School may refer to:

 Brother Rice High School (Chicago)
 Brother Rice High School (Michigan)